N76 may refer to:
 , a submarine of the Royal Navy
 Makilala–Allah Valley Road, in the Philippines
 Millard Airport (Pennsylvania), in Lebanon County, Pennsylvania, United States
 N76 road (Ireland)
 Nokia N76, a mobile phone